The John Adams School is a historic school building in Weymouth, Massachusetts.  The Greek Revival/Italianate school building was built in 1855, on the site of Weymouth's first school building (1681).  It is Weymouth's oldest surviving school building. It is  stories tall, with a front-facing gable roof that has a bracketed gable.  The main facade is three bays wide, with windows that have bracketed surrounds, and a pair of entrances with bracketed cornices above.

The building was listed on the National Register of Historic Places in 1985.  It presently houses a daycare center.

See also
National Register of Historic Places listings in Norfolk County, Massachusetts

References

School buildings on the National Register of Historic Places in Massachusetts
Weymouth, Massachusetts
National Register of Historic Places in Norfolk County, Massachusetts
Historic district contributing properties in Massachusetts